Streptopus amplexifolius (twistedstalk, clasping twistedstalk, claspleaf twistedstalk, white twisted-stalk,  or watermelon berry)  is a species of flowering plant in the family Liliaceae, native to North America, Europe and Asia.

It is a herbaceous perennial plant growing to 40–100 cm tall, with alternate, oblong-lanceolate leaves 5–14 cm long. The greenish-white flowers hang from axils on 1–2 cm thin kinked pedicels, each flower with six white tepals, 9–15 mm long.  The plants leaves completely encircle the stem, and the stems have a kink at each leaf axil giving the plants stem a "twisted" and wiry appearance.    The plants grow in a creeping habit in moist, dense undergrowth.<ref>Lamarck, Jean Baptiste Antoine Pierre de Monnet de & Candolle, Augustin Pyramus de. 1805. Flore Française. Troisième Édition 3: 174, Streptopus amplexifolius'</ref>Krause, Ernst Hans Ludwig. 1906. Deutschlands Flora ed. 2, 1: 115, as Convallaria amplexifolia

DistributionStreptopus amplexifolius is widely distributed across North America (Greenland, northern United States including Alaska; and most of Canada including Yukon and Northwest Territories).  The plant is most often found near shaded stream banks and in moist thickets of the montane and subalpine zones across most of North America.  It is also found in central and southern Europe (from Spain to Ukraine and as far north as Germany and Poland) and in eastern Asia (Japan, Korea, Myanmar (Burma) and eastern Russia (Yakutia, Amur, Kamchatka, Sakhalin, Kuril Islands, Khabarovsk, Primorye)).

 Uses and edibility Streptopus amplexifolius  was used as a food plant by Native Americans in Eastern North America and as a medicine.  The plant was referred to by early settlers of Eastern and Western North America as "wild cucumber" and as "scoot berries" for the mildly laxative effects of the berries if they are eaten in excessive quantities.

The tender young shoots of this plant were eaten by some aboriginal peoples as a salad green, but most considered the plant and berries poisonous.  The shoots are sweet with a cucumber-like flavor.  The berries are reported to be juicy and sweet, with a watermelon-like flavor. The juice of the berries was used as a soothing treatment for burns by Native American.Streptopus amplexifolius has a superficial resemblance to False Solomon's Seal (Maianthemum racemosum), but Twisted Stalk produces axillary flowers and fruits along the stem, where False Solomon's Seal produces a terminal inflorescence.   Also False Solomon's Seal is always a single unbranched stem, while Twisted Stalk can be branched at the bottom. In fruit, Twisted Stalk is easily identified by its large, juicy red berries which grow from each leaf axil and are highly visible, even in the thickest undergrowth, as they boldly contrast with the surrounding foliage.

When young, Twisted Stalk resembles members of the genus Veratrum'', highly toxic plants that are members of the lily family, also.  This plant should not be consumed unless identification is positive.

Notes

References

External links
Flora of North America: Streptopus amplexifolius

Liliaceae
Flora of Europe
Flora of Subarctic America
Flora of temperate Asia
Flora of Alaska
Flora of Canada
Flora of Finland
Flora of Germany
Flora of Greenland
Flora of Japan
Flora of Korea
Flora of the Northern United States
Flora of Poland
Flora of the Russian Far East
Flora of Siberia
Flora of Ukraine
Taxa named by Augustin Pyramus de Candolle
Plants used in traditional Native American medicine
Plants used in Native American cuisine
Flora without expected TNC conservation status